Susannah Townsend,  (born 28 July 1989) is an English field hockey player who plays as a midfielder for Canterbury.

She was educated at Sutton Valence School, alongside Ashley Jackson, where together they each worked towards representing their country, England, in field hockey and is an Alumnus of the University of Kent.

Townsend is openly lesbian.

Club career
For the 2020-21 season she has rejoined former club Canterbury who play in the Women's England Hockey League Division One South.

Townsend has also played club hockey in Germany, in the Feldhockey Bundesliga for Der Club an der Alster, in Belgium for Gantoise and in the Investec Women's Hockey League Premier Division for Canterbury and Reading

International career
She competed for England in the women's hockey tournament at the 2014 Commonwealth Games where she won a silver medal. She announced her retirement from international play on 9 September 2021.

References

External links
 

Profile on England Hockey
Profile on Great Britain Hockey

1989 births
Living people
Commonwealth Games silver medallists for England
English female field hockey players
Field hockey players at the 2014 Commonwealth Games
Field hockey players at the 2016 Summer Olympics
Field hockey players at the 2020 Summer Olympics
Olympic field hockey players of Great Britain
Medalists at the 2016 Summer Olympics
Olympic gold medallists for Great Britain
Olympic medalists in field hockey
Commonwealth Games medallists in field hockey
Members of the Order of the British Empire
Female field hockey midfielders
Der Club an der Alster players
Reading Hockey Club players
Women's England Hockey League players
Feldhockey Bundesliga (Women's field hockey) players
Alumni of the University of Kent
LGBT field hockey players
Lesbian sportswomen
English LGBT sportspeople
Olympic bronze medallists for Great Britain
Medalists at the 2020 Summer Olympics
English expatriate sportspeople in Germany
Medallists at the 2014 Commonwealth Games